Labastide-sur-Bésorgues (Occitan: La Bastida de Besòrgas) is a commune in the Ardèche department in the Auvergne-Rhône-Alpes region in Southern France. In 2019, it had a population of 248.

Demographics

See also
Communes of the Ardèche department

References

Communes of Ardèche
Ardèche communes articles needing translation from French Wikipedia